Nomegestrol, also known as 19-normegestrol, is a steroidal progestin which was patented in 1975 but was never marketed. It is the parent compound of nomegestrol acetate, which is marketed as a progestin.

Nomegestrol shows relatively low affinity for the progesterone receptor, only about 4% of that of progesterone and about 1.6% of that of nomegestrol acetate in one assay.

See also
 Medroxyprogesterone
 Megestrol

References

Abandoned drugs
Norpregnanes
Progestogens